Sigi Wimala Somya Dewi (born June 21, 1983), more popularly known as Sigi Wimala, is an Indonesian model and actress.

Career 

In 1999, she won a cover girl contest, GADIS Sampul, a teen magazine in Indonesia. She later joined Elite Models and modeled in Hong Kong for a year. Sigi started her career on the big screen with a starring role in the box office hit Tentang Dia (About Her) directed by Rudy Soedjarwo, which won Best New Coming Actress in Indonesian Movie Award 2007.

While she studied Architecture at Tarumanegara University, she also took photography course. Her photographs were included in numerous group exhibitions such as Trowulan (2006) at Museum Nasional and Singkawang Jade of Equator (2010) at Galeri Salihara, together with artists such as Jay Subyakto, Yori Antar and Oscar Motuloh.

She then came to directing a music video for RAN, an Indonesian pop group and later on directed her first short film, Boy Crush, produced by an award-winning Indonesian film director, Garin Nugroho.

Personal life 

In 2009, she married Timo Tjahjanto from the Mo Brothers, film director. They met on the set of Macabre (2010 film). Sigi gave birth to a daughter, Maxine Sara-Tjahjanto, and resides in Jakarta.

Filmography 
 Actress
 Tentang Dia
 Kalau Cinta Jangan Cengeng
 Cinta Setaman
 Krazy Crazy Krezy
 Rumah Dara
 Affair
 Director
 "Friday" (RAN) music video
 Boy Crush

Awards and nominations

TVC 
 Simpati Telkomsel
 Ponds
 Green Sand
 Oil of Olay
 Nokia 3350
 Pepsi

References

External links 
 Avatara88

Indonesian female models
Indonesian film actresses
Indonesian former Muslims
Javanese people
Actresses from Jakarta
1983 births
Living people
Converts to Roman Catholicism from Islam